The Tianliao Moon World is an area of badlands in Tianliao District, Kaohsiung, Taiwan.

Name
The area is named Moon World because its surface resembles the surface of the Moon.

History
The formation was formed after years of rain and stream erosion.

Facilities
The area features the Mudstone Geography Center at the entrance, providing information regarding the details of mudstone. It also has footpath for strolling and hiking around the area.

Transportation
The area is accessible by bus from Gangshan Station of Kaohsiung MRT or Tainan Station of Taiwan Railways.

See also
 Geology of Taiwan

References

Badlands
Landforms of Kaohsiung